The 2024 United States presidential election in Arizona is scheduled to take place on Tuesday, November 5, 2024, as part of the 2024 United States elections in which all 50 states plus the District of Columbia will participate. Arizona voters will choose electors to represent them in the Electoral College via a popular vote. The state of Arizona has 11 electoral votes in the Electoral College, following reapportionment due to the 2020 United States census in which the state neither gained nor lost a seat. Arizona is considered to be a crucial swing state in 2024.

Incumbent Democratic president Joe Biden has stated that he intends to run for reelection to a second term. If he wins the state again, he will become the first Democrat since Franklin D. Roosevelt in 1944 to carry the state in two consecutive presidential elections.

Primary elections

Republican primary

The Arizona Republican primary is scheduled to be held on March 19, 2024, alongside primaries in Florida, Illinois, and Ohio.

General election

Polling
Joe Biden vs. Donald Trump

Joe Biden vs. Ron DeSantis

See also 
 United States presidential elections in Arizona
 2024 United States presidential election
 2024 Democratic Party presidential primaries
 2024 Republican Party presidential primaries
 2024 United States elections

Notes

Partisan clients

References 

Arizona
2024
Presidential